Bathylepeta is a genus of sea snails, the true limpets, marine gastropod mollusks in the family Lepetidae.

Species
Species within the genus Bathylepeta include:

 Bathylepeta linseae Schwabe, 2006

References

Lepetidae
Gastropod genera